Doumea thysi is a species of loach catfish found in Nigeria where it is found in the Cross River and Cameroon where it is found in that country's section of the Cross River and Ndian Department.  It reaches a length of 6.5 cm.

the fish is named in honor of ichthyologist Dirk Thys van den Audenaerde (b. 1934) who is the Director at the Musée Royal de l’Afrique Centrale (Tervuren, Belgium), where the type specimen is housed.

References 

 

Amphiliidae
Fish of Africa
Taxa named by Paul Harvey Skelton
Fish described in 1989